Kolkata Circular Railway, also known as the Kolkata Chakra Rail, is a  long railway loop line operated by the Sealdah division of the Eastern Railway zone of Indian Railways, encircling the city of Kolkata.

Services
The line begins and terminates at Dum Dum Junction, with a total of 19 stations spread over the route's  length (Dumdum junction to Majerhat via Princepghat route :-  & Majerhat to Dumdum junction via Ballygunge Junction route :- ). Services on the line are operated as an extension of the Kolkata Suburban Railway, partially sharing tracks with the Sealdah South section.

The tracks mostly run along the Hooghly river and through Kolkata's central business district, carrying around 36,000 passengers daily. There are also direct services which connect this line to the Sealdah South section skipping Sealdah via the Kankurgachi Chord line. The line is mostly served by 9-car EMU rakes from the Narkeldanga EMU carshed and 12-car EMU rakes from the Sonarpur EMU carshed.

The Circular Railway offers direct interchange points with the Line 1 of the Kolkata Metro at Dum Dum Junction and Tollygunge railway stations while serving a number of prominent city landmarks including Prinsep Ghat and Eden Gardens. The line acts as a major connecting link between the Sealdah South and the Sealdah North sections of the Kolkata Suburban Railway.

Kolkata railway station, one of the major railway stations of Kolkata, lies on this line and acts as a major terminus for many national and international long-distance trains like the Akal Takht Express, Hazarduari Express, Maitree Express and Bandhan Express to name a few.

History

Calcutta Port Commissioners' Railway 
The Calcutta Port Commissioners' Railway  was a broad gauge (BG) port railway that opened in stages from 1875 onwards serving the docks area of Calcutta along the bank of the Hooghly from Chitpur in the north to Kidderpore Docks in the south.

The first CPCR line opened from Baghbazar, the then terminus of the Calcutta Municipal Railway to Meerbohur Ghat (present day Meer Bahar Ghat) in 1875. The Baghbazar terminus was connected northwards to the Cossipore Gun & Shell Factory near Chitpur on 1878.

The line was extended southwards up to Kidderpore Docks and was opened to goods traffic by 1891. By 1893 the line was constructed up to Chetla. A branch line was also built in 1893 from Kidderpore Docks to Majerhat

In 1936, the CPCR owned 55 locomotives and 1789 goods wagons.

Eastern Bengal Railway 

In the northern half, the Chitpur Terminus extension was built in 1903 and connected with Dum Dum by the Eastern Bengal Railway .

A loop line meant for goods traffic was built from Dum Dum junction to Dum Dum Cantonment via Patipukur on 1904.

In the southern section the Budge Budge branch line was built from Ballygunge to Budge Budge. This line formed a connection to the CPCR lines at Majerhat and Brace Bridge junctions.

In 1907 the Kankurgachi Chord line was built bypassing Sealdah and linking the northern and southern sections of the Eastern Bengal Railway.

Post-Independence 
With the silting of Hooghly river and inaccessibility of bigger ships most of the CPCR lines fell into disuse while the growing population and traffic problems of Kolkata made planners to think of new commuting solutions. The Ginwala Committee of 1947 and the Garbutt Report of 1966 recommended forming a Circular railway with elevated tracks for lower expenses and easier construction for a north–south corridor.

A high level Metropolitan Transport Team set up by the Planning Commission in 1965 to study the metropolitan transport requirements of Bombay, Calcutta, Delhi and Madras recommended in case of Calcutta, the construction of a part of circular railway known as suburban Dispersal Line (Dum-Dum to Princep Ghat) to facilitate the dispersal of the commuters arriving at the railway terminus at Sealdah and Howrah and a provision of Mass Rapid Transit System (MRTS) for catering to the intra-city traffic .

As a result, the Baghbazar-Prinsep Ghat line was rehabilitated and commissioned for passenger traffic on 15 August 1984. Services were subsequently extended northwards towards Tala and finally to Dum Dum by 17 June 1990.

The Prinsep Ghat-Majerhat elevated section was commissioned in 2005 thus completing the Circular railway line.

The Dum Dum Cantonment–Biman Bandar branch line was built by the Eastern Railway zone of the Indian Railways and was inaugurated in July 2006. Due to losses and poor patronage owing to the location of the station and odd timings of the services, the services on the line were closed down in 2016. The line was further dismantled in 2020 to make way for the Line 4 of the Kolkata Metro.

Stations
Names in bold indicate that the station is a major stop or an important interchange/terminal station.

Proposed stations
Two new stations were planned in the Kankurgachi Chord line section of the line between Park Circus and Sir Gurudas Banerjee Halt stations, namely Kamardanga Halt (serving Tangra) and Beliaghata Main Road but the plan was ultimately cancelled. Although the construction of the Kamardanga Halt station was started on 27 February 2011, it was not completed and currently lies abandoned.

Gallery

See also 
 Transport in Kolkata
 Kolkata Suburban Railway
 Kolkata Metro
 Kolkata Tram

References

 
Eastern Railway Zone
Kolkata Suburban Railway lines
Sealdah railway division
Transport in Kolkata
Kolkata Suburban Railway